The Aire–Fruges and Rimeux-Gournay–Berck railway (CF du ARB) was a  railway from Aire-sur-la-Lys to Berck, in the Pas-de-Calais department of France. It opened in 1891 and closed in 1955.

Background

In France, the building of railways was controlled by the Government. This avoided the duplication of routes that was seen in the United Kingdom and meant that the large cities and towns were connected. The citizens of the smaller towns and villages also wanted railways to be built to connect them to the network. The departments were given authority to oversee the construction of these minor lines, some of which were built to standard gauge and others were narrow gauge.

The Loi Migneret of 12 July 1865 established that railways in France were to be classified as of "General Interest" or "Local Interest". The former were deemed to be of sufficient importance that they could be partly charged to the state. The latter were charged to the department. The CF du ARB came under the control of the Pas-de-Calais department.

History
Rang-du-Fliers was connected to the railway network in November 1847 with the opening of the Longueau–Boulogne railway. A proposal in 1871 to connect Berck to Montreuil with a metre gauge railway was turned down. It was put forward again in 1882 and received authorisation. Also in that year, a standard gauge branch was proposed from Rang-du-Fliers to Berck. In 1886, a M. Macquet was given permission to build a metre gauge railway from Verton to Berck, but he was unable to raise the capital to build it. M. Lambert was given permission that year to build lines from Aire-sur-la-Lys to Fruges and also from Renty to Hucqueliers. The final proposal was to build a line from Berck to Rimieux-Gournay to join the existing Chemin de fer d'Anvin à Calais (CF AC) line, and then from  the CF AC another branch to Aire-sur-la-Lys. In April 1887, an agreement was signed with the CF AC to obtain running powers over the section in question.

Plans for the new line were exhibited at the council offices in Montreuil and Saint-Omer during April and May 1887. No objections were received. On 12 December 1889, the préfet declared the railway to be d'utilite publique (in the public interest) and M. Lambert was given permission to build the line. In June 1890, La Compagnie des Chemins de Fer d'Aire à Fruges et de Rimeux-Gournay à Berck was formed to build and operate the railway. The Chemins de Fer du Nord (CF du Nord) advanced ₣3.8 million to build the line, an average of ₣43,000 per kikometre. The CF AC had cost an average of ₣77,000 to build ten years earlier.

The line was extended a further  to Montreuil-sur-Mer station on the Saint-Pol-sur-Ternoise–Étaples railway on 6 April 1893. The  line from Aire-sur-la-Lys to Gourgesson, on the CF AC, opened on 1 June 1893 and the final  section from Rimeux-Gournay of the CF AC to Montreuil-sur-Mer opened on 30 July. Although initially operated as separate systems, by 1893 the AC and CF du ARB were being run as on, with locomotives and rolling stock from one line being used on the other.

The line was much longer due to the need to avoid heavy engineering and serve the communities along the route. Apart from one bridge over a road at Wailly-Beauchamp and the bridge over the railway at Rang-du-Fliers, all crossings were on the level. The maximum gradient was 17mm/metre, apart from one  stretch of 2.4 mm/metre at Gournay. There were at least 43 level crossings, including five on the stretch of line shared with the CF AC. The majority of level crossings were ungated.

In 1892, a railway was planned from Dompierre-sur-Authie, Somme to Wailly, linking with the Réseau des Bains de Mer system.

In 1909, the station building at Berck-Plage was demolished and rebuilt in the "grand hotel" style. In 1910, an alternative plan was put forward for a railway from Dompierre-sur-Authie to Berck. The CF du ARB carried 501,208 passengers in 1911. In 1913, plans were put forward for an electric tramway from Bruay-la-Buissière to Aire-sur-la-Lys, with the section of the CF du ARB from Aire-sur-la-Lys to Fruges being electrified, and a rebuilding of the station at Fruges. The plan for the electric tramway was not resurrected post-war. None of the lines were built.

The CF du ARB remained behind Allied lines during World War I. It fell within a security zone known as the Reserved Zone. Civilians living within this zone had free travel within the Canton in which they lived. To travel beyond their own Canton, or in and out of the Reserved Zone, a sauf-conduit (identity card) was required. Civilian passengers had to leave their train and go into the station building to have their papers checked when crossing Cantons. A procedure which led to complaints as some passengers missed their train when it departed whilst their papers were being checked. Military personnel had their papers checked on board the train. Services were reduced in frequency, with military  and freight traffic taking priority. Civilian services were reduced during the war, with further reductions inn 1917 and 1918. In March and April 1918, Aire-sur-la-Lys came within shelling range of German artillery following gains made by the Germans during the Spring Offensive. In late April, 296 Railway Company, Royal Engineers established a major depot at Rang-du-Fliers. This included a repair facility for both standard- and metre-gauge locomotives. Aire-sur-la-Lys was bombed on 16 May, but damage to tracks was repaired within 24 hours. In August, a chord was laid at Gourgesson Junction enabling trains to run directly between Aire-sur-la-Lys and Anvin without reversing.

At the end of the war, the railway was suffering from locomotives that were under-maintained, and some of its rolling stock had been transferred to other lines during the war. On the other hand, it had gained some rolling stock from other lines and there was captured German rolling stock which had been declared a prize of war. Locomotive deficiencies due to the war would affect the CF du ARB until 1925. In 1919, the CF du ARB was acquired by the Compagnie Générale des Voies Ferrées d'Intérêt Local (VFIL), along with the Ardres–Pont-d'Ardres steam tram ( TvAPA), CF AC and CF des Flandres in the Nord department.

In 1924, a proposal was made to convert the line between Aire-sur-la-Lys and Thérouanne to standard gauge. In 1925, the department reported on the lateness of trains on the CF du ARB. It was explained that this was caused by the fact that all passenger services were provided by means of mixed trains, and locomotive maintenance deficiencies due to the war were still causing problems. In 1930, third class was abolished on the CF du ARB, and carriages were reclassified as second class. In 1937, Berck town council proposed that the line between Rang-du-Fliers and Berck Plage be converted to three-rail dual gauge. This proposal was rejected by VFIL and the department. VFIL objected on cost grounds - ₣1.38 million per kilometre for track and ₣3.5 million for a 30-tonne standard gauge steam locomotive.

World War II broke out on 3 September, with Calais falling into German hands on 25 May 1940. The Pas-de-Calais department became a zone of special control, administered by the Oberkommando der Wehrmacht in Brussels, Belgium. Along the coast was the "red zone". It was said that French law did not apply in this zone. Under the terms of the armistice, France was to hand over its railways to the Germans undamaged and was to work with the German authorities to restore them to serviceable condition. In May 1942, a branch line was built at Berck-Ville to connect with the aerodrome, then in use by the Luftwaffe. Services were again reduced due to the German authorities requisitioning some of the locomotives and stock of the CF du ARB. Military services took priority over civilian services. In September 1943, eight bogie carriages were severely damaged when Berck-Plage came under heavy bombardment. Some of the carriages were running in December with missing glass, leading to complaints in a local newspaper.

By May 1945, services on the CF du ARB had been reduced even further, caused mainly by a shortage of fuel. They were worse than they had been a year earlier, although an increase in the number of trains was made in 1946.} In 1948, the department tried to have the concession to run the CF du ARB removed from VFIL, claiming that the latter were unreliable concessionaires. This was vigorously opposed by VFIL, who retained the concession until closure. On 1 September 1952, the Aire-sur-la-Lys - Fruges section of line was closed. The local newspaper in Aire-sur-la-Lyse foresaw the closing of the remaining lines. Aire-sur-la-Lys was to lose its passenger services on the Standard gauge Saint-Omer–Berguette line on 3 October 1954. The remainder of the CF du ARB closed on 1 March 1955. The closure was lamented by "the Voice of the North", which published a song to mark the end. The last service from Berck-Plage was operated by a Billard A150D6 railcar. Buses replaced passenger trains, with SNCF providing a freight service using lorries.

Operation
The CF du ARB was operated in a similar manner to the CF AC. The line was operated on a token system. Unusually for France, where a paper token was the norm for minor lines, brass tokens were in use. If two or more trains were to travel in the same direction, a paper token was issued to all but the last train, which carried the brass token. Trains had a crew of three: the conducteur or chef de train (guard), who was in overall charge of the train, the chauffeur (fireman) and the mécanicien (driver). At stations, the departure of a train would be signalled by the station master blowing a whistle. The conducteur then blew a small trumpet to indicate that he agreed the train was ready to depart, and the mécanicien then started the train. No through ticketing arrangement existed with the CF du Nord.

Stations
Stations were of a standard design with a two-storey main building and a single story wing for freight. Halts just had a single storey building, all of which were later extended. Arrêts were provided with a small shelter.

For further details of stations marked "CF AC", refer to the article on that system.

Industries served by the line included a pair of factories at Moulin-le-Comte, a cement factory and quarry at Vincly, quarries at Matringhem, Wailly and Verton, Messrs Albert & Lerroy's brickworks at Attin, Messrs Garry's sucrerie at Rang-du-Fliers and Messrs Soubitez's sawmill at Berck-Plage.

Rolling stock

Locomotives
The CF du ARB owned the following steam locomotives.

Railcars
Four railcars carried numbers that suggested they were allocated to the CF du ARB.

Passenger stock
For the opening of the line, the CF du ARB bought ten bogie carriages with end platforms. Four were tri-composites, seating 6 first class, 7 second class and 40 third class. The other six were composites, seating 12 first class and 27 second class. By 1911, there were sixteen bogie carriages, comprising nine tri-composites, five composites and two all-thirds. There were also twelve baggage vans.

Freight stock
By 1911, the CF du ARB owned 43 flat wagons, 71 open wagons, 34 vans and a crane.

References

Sources

Transport in Pas-de-Calais
Metre gauge railways in France
Railway companies of France
Railway lines in Hauts-de-France
Railway lines opened in 1891
Railway lines closed in 1955